Uncross the Stars is a 2008 movie set in Arizona starring Daniel Gillies, Barbara Hershey, Ron Perlman, and Irma P. Hall. It was directed by Kenny Golde and written by Ted Henning.

Plot 
A young man called Troy (Gillies) grieving from the loss of his wife, is asked by his Aunt Hilda (Hershey) to build her a porch on her house in a desert community in Arizona, where he interacts with the colorful locals and tries to find reconciliation.

Cast 
 Daniel Gillies as Troy
 Barbara Hershey as Hilda
 Ron Perlman as Bobby
 Irma P. Hall as Lulu
 Pat Crawford Brown as Norma
 Linda Porter as Phyllis
 Takayo Fischer as Tina
 Jane Shayne as Mildred
 Suzanne Ford as Joyce
 Princess Lucaj as Linda
 Elizabeth Tulloch as Corrine (as Bitsie Tulloch)
 Jason Hillhouse as Willy
 Patrick Thomas O'Brien as Priest (as Patrick O'Brien)
 Franc Ross as Hack
 Paul Keith as Lawrence Hutchinson

Reception 
DVD Talk said it was "beautifully filmed" but overall found it "cliche(d)" and gave it a negative review. The Dove Foundation called it "a very charming movie."

References

External links 
 

2008 films
2008 comedy films
2008 drama films
American comedy films
American drama films
Films set in Arizona
2000s English-language films
2000s American films